The 2018 Nigeria Professional Football League was the 47th season of the Nigeria Premier League, the top Nigerian professional league for association football clubs, since its establishment in 1972, and the 28th since the rebranding of the league as the "Professional League". 
Plateau United won the 2017 season, their first ever title, which came in their second season after being promoted to the top flight.

The season started on 13 January 2018.

Clubs
A total of 20 teams contested the league including 16 teams from the previous season and four teams promoted from the Nigeria National League.

League table

The league was suspended after 24 rounds due to administrative problems. On 31 August 2018, the Nigeria Professional Football League announced the season was deemed concluded. No champions were awarded and the bottom four teams were not relegated. Lobi Stars, as first place in the league table, were nominated as the Nigerian representatives in the 2018–19 CAF Champions League. Four teams were promoted from the Nigeria National League and 24 teams will compete in the 2018–19 Nigeria Professional Football League season.

Season statistics

Goals

Top scorers
Junior Lokosa 19 goals

Hat-tricks

References

External links
Nigeria 2018, RSSSF.com

Nigeria Professional Football League seasons
Nig
2017–18 in Nigerian football